Murex djarianensis is a species of large predatory sea snail, a marine gastropod mollusk in the family Muricidae, the rock snails or murex snails.

Subspecies 
 Murex djarianensis poppei Houart, 1979

References

Gastropods described in 1895
Murex